Jeffery Lamar Williams (born August 16, 1991), known professionally as Young Thug, is an American rapper, singer, and songwriter. He is considered to be an influential figure of his generation, with his music impacting the modern sound of hip hop and trap music. Known for his eccentric vocal style and fashion, Thug initially released a series of independent mixtapes beginning in 2011 with I Came from Nothing. In early 2013, he signed with Gucci Mane's 1017 Records, and later that year he released his label debut mixtape 1017 Thug to critical praise.

Young Thug received mainstream recognition in 2014 with the singles "Stoner" and "Danny Glover" in addition to appearances on several singles, including T.I.'s "About the Money", Tyga's "Hookah", and Rich Gang's "Lifestyle". That year, he also signed to Lyor Cohen's 300 Entertainment and collaborated on the mixtape Rich Gang: Tha Tour Pt. 1. In 2015, he amassed a number of mixtapes, including Barter 6 and two installments of his Slime Season series. Subsequently in 2016, Thug issued commercial mixtapes I'm Up, Slime Season 3, and Jeffery. In 2017, Thug featured on the worldwide hit "Havana" by Cuban pop singer Camila Cabello, which became his first number-one single on the Billboard Hot 100. In 2018, he released a compilation album Slime Language with his label YSL Records. In 2019, he won the Grammy Award for Song of the Year for his contributions to Childish Gambino's "This Is America".

Young Thug's debut studio album, So Much Fun (2019), debuted at number one on the US Billboard 200 and included the Billboard Hot 100 top-twenty singles "The London" and "Hot". The following year, his single "Go Crazy" with Chris Brown from the collaborative mixtape Slime & B (2020) peaked at number three on the Hot 100, becoming his first top-ten single as a lead artist. Additionally, he reached number one on the Billboard Hot 100 for the second time in his career with his feature alongside M.I.A. on Travis Scott's single "Franchise", In 2021, Thug released the compilation album Slime Language 2 which debuted at number one on the Billboard 200. Later that year, Thug would reach number one on the Hot 100 a third time by featuring alongside Future on Drake's "Way 2 Sexy". His second studio album, Punk, was released on October 15, 2021. It debuted at number one on the Billboard 200, becoming his third number-one album, as well as his second chart topping project of 2021.

Early life
Jeffery Lamar Williams was born in Atlanta, the tenth of eleven children. He is from Sylvan Hills, a neighborhood in Atlanta (Zone 3), and grew up in the Jonesboro South projects. Other rappers from the neighborhood include Waka Flocka Flame, 2 Chainz, Ludacris and Williams's childhood friend PeeWee Longway, from whom Williams lived four doors down.
Young Thug has told interviewers that he was expelled in the sixth grade for breaking a teacher's arm. He was sent to juvenile prison for four years.

Career

2010–2013: Early career and record deal

Young Thug began his musical career in 2010, debuting as a guest appearance on rapper TruRoyal's song "She Can Go". After releasing the first three installments of his mixtape series I Came from Nothing throughout 2011 and 2012, Young Thug caught the attention of fellow Atlanta-based rapper Gucci Mane, who went on to sign Young Thug to his label 1017 Brick Squad Records, an Asylum/Atlantic imprint, in 2013. Thug released his first project on the label, his fourth mixtape, 1017 Thug. The mixtape was met with positive reviews from music critics, which noted it for its original style. 1017 Thug was included in a number of year-end lists for 2013, such as the Pitchfork Albums of the Year: Honorable Mention and Complexs The 50 Best Albums of 2013. 

FACT called it the best mixtape of 2013, Rolling Stone placed it at number five on their 10 Best Mixtapes of 2013 and The Guardian placed it among The Five Best Mixtapes of 2013. Young Thug's song "Picacho" was noted as one of the standout tracks from the mixtape; although it was not released as a single, the song was included on a number of 2013 year-end lists, such as Rolling Stones 100 Best Songs of 2013, Pitchfork'''s The Top 100 Tracks of 2013, and Spins 50 Best Songs of 2013.

In July 2013, Complex included him in their list of 25 New Rappers to Watch Out For. In October 2013, Young Thug released his commercial debut single "Stoner". The song spawned a number of unofficial remixes by several rappers, including Wale, Jim Jones, Jadakiss, Iamsu! and Trick-Trick, among others. Thug expressed his disapproval for the remixes, commenting "If you feel like my song isn't tough enough to the point where you have to freestyle... Don't think I'm happy that you're doing it because of who you are. I'm ready for war." 

His song "Danny Glover" received a number of remixes by Waka Flocka Flame and Nicki Minaj, among others. In October 2013, Young Thug appeared on a few tracks on 19 & Boomin by Metro Boomin, including "Some More", the first song he made with Alex Tumay, who became his go-to engineer for almost everything from then until "Slime Season 2". In December 2013, Thug performed at Fool's Gold Day Off show in Miami, among Danny Brown, Trick Daddy and Travis Scott.

Pitchfork ranked 1017 Thug as one of the best albums of the first half of the 2010s decade, at number 96.

2014: Rise to popularity and label issues
In January 2014, Young Thug revealed that he had been offered $8.5 million to sign to Future's Freebandz record label. In March 2014, Young Thug's affiliation with Cash Money Records and its chief executive officer (CEO) Birdman, resulted in much speculation in the media about him signing to the label. The label's publicist later stated this was untrue. On March 28, 2014, Ronald "Caveman" Rosario, director of Urban Music at 1017 Distribution, cleared the situation, stating that Young Thug signed a management deal with Birdman's Rich Gang, not a record deal, and is still signed to 1017 Brick Squad.

In 2014, Thug also recorded several songs with Kanye West, who praised him for his ability to make songs so fast. Thug announced that he had upcoming mixtapes with Rich Homie Quan, Chief Keef and Bloody Jay. Young Thug would go on to be featured on the March 2014 cover of The Fader. On March 11, 2014, his debut single "Stoner", was serviced to rhythmic contemporary radio in the United States by Asylum and Atlantic Records. On March 24, 2014, Thug stated his debut album would be titled Carter 6, referencing the highly acclaimed Tha Carter album series by American hip hop superstar Lil Wayne, who has been the biggest influence in Young Thug's music career. 

Two days later, it was revealed that Young Thug was working on a collaborative album with American record producer Metro Boomin, which is titled Metro Thuggin and set for release in spring 2014. The first song from the project, titled "The BLanguage", uses elements from Canadian rapper Drake's "The Language", was released the same day. In April 2014, Young Thug released a new 808 Mafia-produced song titled "Eww", which was named one of the five best songs of the week by XXL. A remix of the song was supposed to be on Thug's debut album with verses from Lil Wayne and Drake, but that never happened.

On June 17, 2014, Kevin Liles confirmed that Young Thug had been officially signed to his and Lyor Cohen's label 300 Entertainment. On July 1, 2014, Asylum Records and Atlantic Records officially released Young Thug's 2013 fan-favorite song "Danny Glover", re-titling it "2 Bitches". Also on July 1, Mass Appeal Records released "Old English", the first single from their compilation album Mass Appeal Vol. 1, which features Young Thug alongside fellow American rappers ASAP Ferg and Freddie Gibbs. On October 16, 2014, the first single from Cash Money Records Rich Gang 2 compilation, was released titled "Take Kare", featuring Young Thug and Lil Wayne. The December 4, 2014 issue of Rolling Stone called Young Thug the "most exciting new voice of hip-hop" and "hip-hop's new crown prince". At the end of the year, music critic Robert Christgau named Black Portland—Young Thug's collaborative mixtape with Bloody Jay—the fourth best album of 2014.

 2015–2016: Barter 6 and Slime Season series 

In 2015, a series of data breaches leaked hundreds of unreleased tracks from Young Thug's archives to the Internet. Young Thug's planned debut album was set for release in 2015, and was said to be named Carter 6, in homage to Lil Wayne's upcoming album, Tha Carter V. Lil Wayne, however, wasn't happy about the tribute, telling the audience of a show in April 2015 to "stop listening" to Young Thug. After claiming he's been threatened with lawsuits, Young Thug announced that he was changing the title to Barter 6 and clarified that it would be a mixtape rather than his debut album. Young Thug announced April 18, 2015, that his official debut album will be titled Hy!£UN35, which translates to "HiTunes". 

In May 2015, after much confusion as to who he was signed to and managed by, having been aligned with Gucci Mane's 1017 Records, Future's Freebandz, Lyor Cohen's 300 Entertainment and Birdman's Rich Gang, Young Thug revealed "I manage myself. I'm signed with Atlantic. I have a big, special deal with Atlantic, and it's only Atlantic. Birdman is my homie." He revealed he would be releasing another mixtape prior to the album, titled Tha Carter V.

To circumvent their further spread of leaked tracks, Thug released the well-received compilation mixtapes Slime Season and Slime Season 2. Young Thug revealed in late June 2015 that he and Kanye West have discussed the prospect of a joint album together, both agreeing after a meeting in the spring. Details are still scarce, but Thug said Kanye was impressed after previewing his unreleased music. "I was letting him hear all the music. Then he said I was like Bob Marley and he wanted to do an album with me. I was like, 'Let's roll!'" the rapper said. Young Thug appeared on West's 2016 album The Life of Pablo, and West tweeted that he would release further collaborations with Young Thug on Tidal. 

In July 2015, 300 Entertainment released a promotional single, "Pacifier", in support of Young Thug's debut album HiTunes (stylized as Hy!£UN35). The song features production from Mike Will Made-It, and was noted by critics for its experimentation with more extreme vocal scatting. On February 4, 2016, Young Thug released a mixtape titled I'm Up. On March 26, 2016, he released the final installment of the Slime Season series in Slime Season 3, declaring the mixtape the end of a phase marked by leaked material. Young Thug toured the United States on his May 2016 Hi-Tunes tour, which featured artists Dae Dae, TM88, and Rich The Kid.

2016–2018: Jeffery and collaborations

Young Thug was featured in Calvin Klein's Fall 2016 fashion campaign, along with Frank Ocean among others. On July 9, 2016, he announced his self-titled mixtape Jeffery was coming out soon. On August 16, 2016, Thug announced he would change his name to Jeffery for one week, the week during the release of the Jeffery mixtape. The album artwork features Young Thug dressed in an androgynous dress designed by Italian designer Alessandro Trincone, and was photographed by Garfield Lamond. The artwork went viral and prompted a wide range of responses on social media. In November 2016, he announced he was starting his own record label imprint called YSL records.

In March 2017, Thug was featured on Drake's songs "Sacrifices" and "Ice Melts" on the former's commercial mixtape, More Life, the former song being alongside 2 Chainz. He was featured on Calvin Harris' song "Heatstroke" along with Ariana Grande and Pharrell Williams, released in March 2017. In April 2017, Young Thug announced the commercial mixtape Beautiful Thugger Girls, originally titled E.B.B.T.G. The project was executively-produced by Drake and was released on June 16, 2017. In August, he featured on Camila Cabello's single "Havana", which peaked at number one on the Billboard Hot 100, becoming his first number-one hit. In September 2017, he released a joint EP with DJ Carnage titled Young Martha. In October 2017, Thug released a collaborative mixtape with Future titled Super Slimey. It includes tracks recorded by each of the artists individually as well as both together, and features guest vocals from rapper Offset.

In 2018, Young Thug released the single "Ride for Me", a collaboration by A-Trak, Falcons, and 24hrs via A-Trak's record label Fool's Gold. He released the EP Hear No Evil in April 2018. Young Thug co-wrote and provided background vocals on Childish Gambino's "This Is America", which debuted at number one on the Billboard Hot 100 chart for May 19, 2018. In August 2018, he released another compilation album, Slime Language.

2019–2020: So Much Fun and Slime & B

On May 23, 2019, Young Thug released the single "The London", featuring American rappers J. Cole and Travis Scott. On the same day, also announced his forthcoming debut studio album, which was originally called Gold Mouf Dog. On July 19, 2019, Young Thug announced that the album had been renamed to So Much Fun. On August 10, 2019, Young Thug announced the album's release date and cover art. The track listing was revealed on August 15. The album was released on August 16, 2019, the rapper's 28th birthday. It features guest appearances from Future, Machine Gun Kelly, Gunna, Lil Baby, Lil Uzi Vert, Lil Duke, 21 Savage, Doe Boy, Lil Keed, Quavo, Juice Wrld, Nav, J. Cole, and Travis Scott. The album debuted at number one on the US Billboard 200.

On October 20, 2019, Young Thug appeared on The Tonight Show Starring Jimmy Fallon alongside Gunna. On October 31, 2019, a song from the album called "Hot", featuring American rapper and fellow labelmate Gunna, became the album's second single due to a remix with an additional feature from Travis Scott. "The London", which peaked at number 12 and 11, respectively, on the Billboard Hot 100. The deluxe edition of the album was released on December 20, 2019, with extra guest appearances from Gunna and Travis Scott, separately and including the remix of "Hot".

On April 29, 2020, Young Thug and American singer Chris Brown announced their collaborative mixtape, Slime & B. It was released on May 5, 2020, which was the latter's 31st birthday. It features guest appearances from Major Nine, Gunna, Lil Duke, Too Short, E-40, HoodyBaby, and Future. The mixtape's lead single, "Go Crazy", peaked at number three on the Billboard Hot 100, becoming Thug's highest-charting single as a lead artist. On September 25, Thug was featured alongside British rapper M.I.A. on fellow American rapper and singer Travis Scott's single "Franchise", which debuted at number one on the Billboard Hot 100, making Thug's second number-one single. Throughout the year, he had fourteen chart entries on the Hot 100, due to several collaborations with other artists.

2021–present: Punk

On April 16, 2021, YSL Records, along with Young Thug and Gunna, released their second compilation album Slime Language 2. The album debuted at number one on the Billboard 200 and included guest appearances from notable non-YSL Record members Travis Scott, Drake, Rowdy Rebel, Lil Baby, YTB Trench, Lil Uzi Vert, Coi Leray, Big Sean, NAV, Skepta, Future, YNW Melly, BSlime, Sheck Wes, and Kid Cudi, with production mainly handled by Southside, Wheezy, and Turbo. It was supported by two singles "Take It to Trial", and "That Go!". A deluxe edition was released on April 23, containing eight new songs. Thug later released a deluxe, which featured artists including DaBaby and Don Toliver.

In July 2021, Young Thug advertised his second studio album Punk with a release date of October 15, 2021. The album was originally announced in August 2019 and was expected shortly after the release of So Much Fun. "Tick Tock" was released as the intended lead single from the album, on August 20, 2021, but was excluded from the final track listing. In September 2021, Thug reached number one on the Billboard Hot 100 for the third time in his career with his feature alongside Future on "Way 2 Sexy", the lead single off Drake's album Certified Lover Boy. On October 15, Thug released his album Punk.

In November 2021, after the release of Punk, Kobalt Music Group announced a new global publishing deal with Young Thug. In this deal, Young Thug's publishing administration, global synch, and creative services will be handled by Kobalt.

Artistry

Musical style and influence
Young Thug has received both praise and criticism for his eccentric and unique vocal style, which has been described as departing from traditional rap lyricism and sometimes intelligible meaning. Jeff Weiss of BBC called him the "most influential rapper of the 21st century." According to The Fader, "in a typical Young Thug verse, he slurs, shouts, whines and sings, feverishly contorting his voice into a series of odd timbres like a beautifully played but broken wind instrument." Pitchfork called his style "extraordinarily distinctive" and "a weird, experimental approach to rapping" while praising his "presence, persona, mystique, and, potentially, star power." Billboard wrote that "Thug uses this multiplicative vocal delivery to his advantage: where another rapper might lapse into repetition, he finds a new way to distress and warp his tone, to burrow resourcefully into rhythmic cracks and crevices." Complex noted his aptitude for creating catchy, melodic hooks. XXL called him a "rap weirdo", stating that "Thug's charisma, unhinged flow and hooks make his music intriguing." Critic Sheldon Pearce wrote that "Thug understands the modern pop song construction better than anyone: anything and everything can be a hook."

Young Thug has been noted for his fast working method, with several collaborators observing his tendency to freestyle tracks live in the studio or quickly develop lyrics on the spot. He doesn't write down lyrics on paper, but has been known to plan lyrics by drawing shapes and signs. Consequence of Sound stated that "his work is constantly rooted in improvisation, an inherently thrilling concept that's embedded itself in black music." Discussing his work, Williams has claimed the ability to write a hit song in ten minutes and said "I'm in the studio so much, I'll just try stuff. I just think and try, think and try. I don't really know how to sing, but I've been trying for years." Young Thug has cited American rapper Lil Wayne, as his biggest idol and influence. In an interview with Complex magazine he says, "I want to get in the studio with Wayne more than anybody in the world." He has cited mentor Gucci Mane and Kanye West as influences.

Image and fashionVibe Magazine called Young Thug "one of the most unpredictable, charismatic, and outlandish personalities in hip hop today." Rovi called him a "fashion icon". His wardrobe has been described as eccentric and consists predominantly of women's clothing, which he has preferred to wear since age 12. The Seattle Times wrote that "with a fashion sense as unconventional as his rapping, Young Thug can regularly be seen on his Instagram account rocking painted fingernails, skintight jeans or a kids-size dress as a shirt, which, along with his habit of regularly referring to close male friends as 'hubbie' or 'lover' has led to rumors about his sexual orientation."

In an advertisement for Calvin Klein, Thug proclaimed "In my world, you can be a gangsta with a dress or you can be a gangsta with baggy pants." Fusion described him as "defying gender stereotypes and agitating the way hip-hop defines black masculinity, through his eccentric sense of style." He has been compared to David Bowie, Prince, and Little Richard. The media has called him gender fluid and androgynous. GQ called him "at once a hero and an outsider and a leader of the psychedelic fashion movement of rap hippies."

In February 2018, Young Thug rebranded himself as "SEX".

 Personal life 
Young Thug has six children by four women, three sons and three daughters. He became a father at the age of 17. In April 2015, he became engaged to Jerrika Karlae, who runs a swimsuit line and whose mother managed the late Young Dolph. Thug bought his first home in September 2016 after the release of his mixtape Jeffery. The home, in Buckhead, Atlanta, is more than 11,000 square-feet, has six bedrooms, 11 bathrooms, a full bar, a theater room and a four-car garage.

During his childhood, one of Thug's older brothers was shot and killed in front of the family home.

In April 2020, during a concert livestream, Thug revealed a recent brush with death, stating: 

 Philanthropy 
In December 2016, Thug joined the #fightpovertyagain campaign. On June 29, 2017, Thug donated all proceeds of a sold-out concert to Planned Parenthood, stating on Twitter that "I was a teenage parent. Planned+unplanned parenthood is beautiful."

 Legal issues 
In April 2015, after a Lil Wayne tour bus was fired at by members of the Bloods street-gang, Young Thug was one of the individuals involved in a lawsuit after the bus driver of the tour bus decided to sue him as well as Cash Money Records, Young Money Records and Birdman.

A lawsuit was filed against Thug in January 2017 after he didn't show up at a concert in Sahlen's Stadium after a $55,000 contract was signed. This wasn't the first time a lawsuit has been filed against him for not appearing at a concert, as a Texas production company had done the same in April 2016 after he failed to perform at a concert.

Thug was cleared of battery in April 2017 after reportedly slapping a woman outside a nightclub the previous month. The woman was arguing with Thug's fiancée, Jerrika Karlae, when Thug supposedly stepped in and struck the woman. The charges were dropped due to a lack of evidence.

Young Thug's gun and drug charges were dropped in April 2017 following a raid of his then-home in Sandy Springs, Georgia which resulted in him being charged with felony cocaine possession, felony marijuana possession, and three counts of felony gun possession. Thug's lawyers argued that police conducted the search without a warrant which led to the D.A. dropping all charges except felony marijuana possession. It was reported in April 2017 that Thug was being sued by Heritage Select Homes for owing almost $2.2 million in house payments.

On September 24, 2017, Thug was arrested in Brookhaven, Georgia on multiple drug possession charges and possession of a firearm. He was released on bond three days later. On September 7, 2018, he was charged with possession and intent to distribute meth, hydrocodone, and marijuana. He's also charged with possession of amphetamine, alprazolam, codeine (2 counts), and a firearm.

On May 9, 2022, Thug was arrested in Atlanta on gang-related charges. Thug and Gunna were among the 28 people associated with YSL who were charged in a 56-count Racketeer Influenced and Corrupt Organizations Act (RICO) indictment filed by Fulton County District Attorney Fani Willis. Following a search of his home he was charged with seven additional felonies related to possession of illegal substances and illegal firearms. He was held at the Fulton County Superior Court.

DiscographySo Much Fun (2019)Punk'' (2021)

Awards and nominations

References

External links
 
 
 
 

 
1991 births
21st-century American rappers
Living people
1017 Brick Squad artists
African-American male rappers
American hip hop singers
Asylum Records artists
Atlantic Records artists
Cash Money Records artists
Grammy Award winners
Mumble rappers
Pop rappers
Trap musicians
Rappers from Atlanta
Singers from Georgia (U.S. state)
Songwriters from Georgia (U.S. state)
Southern hip hop musicians
Bankroll Mafia members
African-American male singer-songwriters
21st-century African-American male singers
Experimental musicians